Paul Conway Leahy (February 9, 1904 – July 3, 1966) was a United States district judge of the United States District Court for the District of Delaware.

Education and career

Born in Wilmington, Delaware, Leahy received a Bachelor of Science degree from the University of Delaware in 1926 and a Bachelor of Laws from the University of Pennsylvania Law School in 1929. He was in private practice in Wilmington from 1929 to 1942.

Federal judicial service

On December 23, 1941, Leahy was nominated by President Franklin D. Roosevelt to a seat on the United States District Court for the District of Delaware vacated by Judge John Percy Nields. Leahy was confirmed by the United States Senate on January 7, 1942, and received his commission on January 14, 1942. He served as Chief Judge from 1948 to 1957, assuming senior status due to a certified disability on October 7, 1957. Leahy served in that capacity until his death on July 3, 1966.

References

Sources
 

1904 births
1966 deaths
People from Wilmington, Delaware
Judges of the United States District Court for the District of Delaware
United States district court judges appointed by Franklin D. Roosevelt
20th-century American judges
University of Pennsylvania Law School alumni
University of Delaware alumni
Place of death missing